"Me" is a song by Canadian recording artist Tamia. It was written and produced by Shep Crawford for the singer's second album A Nu Day (2000), but it did not make into the final track list. However it was later included on her fourth studio album  Between Friends (2006) and released as its second single in 2007, reaching number 29 on the US Hot R&B/Hip-Hop Songs chart.

Background
"Me" was written and produced by frequent collaborator Shep Crawford. The song was initially conceived during the production of her second studio album A Nu Day (2000). On her decision to omit the song from the final track lisiting, Tamia elaborated in 2019: "I recorded "Stranger in My House" and "Me" at the same time. Both songs I really loved. But "Stranger" was this big record, so I decided to only put it on the A Nu Day album and I saved "Me" because I felt like it was too much of a good thing. I kept it and used it later."

Music video
The music video for the song was directed by Canadian director Margaret Malandruccolo, who later shot the video for "Almost." The video begins with Tamia laying down on a bed until the questions about a lover arise. We then see hands and someone on the edge of the bed. Tamia later roams around the house. At the end she is shown standing up from a vanity revealing her pregnant belly.

Track listing

Notes
 denotes additional producer

Credits and personnel 
Credits adapted from the liner notes of Between Friends.

Shep Crawford – instruments, production, writer
Brian Gardner – mastering
Tamia Hill – vocals
Mike Sroka – engineering
Dexter Simmons – mixing
Rob Torres – guitar

Charts

Weekly charts

Year-end charts

References

2007 singles
Tamia songs
2006 songs
Songs written by Shep Crawford
Music videos directed by Margaret Malandruccolo